Lipany is a town in Sabinov District, Prešov Region in northeastern Slovakia.

Lipany may also refer to:
 Lipany (Vitice), part of Vitice village in Central Bohemian Region, Czech Republic
 Battle of Lipany, fought at Lipany, Vitice in 1434 during the Hussite Wars
 Lipany (Cimrman), a fictional theatrical group created by the fictional Czech playwright/inventor and overall "genius" Jára Cimrman
 Lipany (crater), on Mars
 ŠK Odeva Lipany, an association football club based in Lipany, Slovakia

See also
 Lipan (disambiguation)
 Lipiany (disambiguation)
 Lipiny (disambiguation)